is a railway station on the Kyūshū Railway Company (JR Kyūshū) Chikuhō Main Line (also known as the Wakamatsu Line) located in Wakamatsu-ku, Kitakyushu, Fukuoka Prefecture, Japan.

Station layout 
There is a single island platform currently served by one track.

History 
On 1 October 1897, the company, now renamed the Chikuho Railway, merged with the Kyushu Railway. After the Kyushu Railway was nationalized on 1 July 1907, Japanese Government Railways (JGR) took over control of the station. On 12 October 1909, the station became part of the Chikuho Main Lines. With the privatization of Japanese National Railways (JNR), the successor of JGR, on 1 April 1987, control of the station passed to JR Kyushu.

Passenger statistics
In fiscal 2016, the station was used by an average of 1,342 passengers daily (boarding passengers only), and it ranked 131st among the busiest stations of JR Kyushu.

Surrounding area
Wakamatsu Station is the easternmost station on the Chikuhō Main Line and lies about 500 meters southwest of the Wakato Bridge.  The surrounding area, once home to a freight yard, has seen the development of new residential condominiums in recent years. National Route 199 is immediately northwest of the station.

The nearest city bus stop is located northeast of the station along National Route 495.

References

External links
 Wakamatsu Station 

Railway stations in Japan opened in 1891
Railway stations in Fukuoka Prefecture
Buildings and structures in Kitakyushu